Brenibba is a nunatak protruding from the north end of the Jostedalsbreen glacier in the Breheimen mountain range. It is located in the municipality of Luster in Vestland county, Norway. It is part of the Jostedalsbreen National Park.

Name
The first element is bre which means "glacier" and the last element is the finite form of nibbe which means "mountain peak".

References

Mountains of Vestland
Luster, Norway